Zeyad Eashash (born 23 October 1998) is a Jordanian boxer. He competed in the men's welterweight event at the 2020 Summer Olympics.

His brother, Hussein, is also a boxer.

References

External links
 

1998 births
Living people
Jordanian male boxers
Olympic boxers of Jordan
Boxers at the 2020 Summer Olympics
Sportspeople from Amman
Asian Games medalists in boxing